The Real People are an English rock band formed in Liverpool in 1988. The band currently consists of Anthony "Tony" Griffiths (bass guitar, vocals), Chris Griffiths (guitar, vocals), Martin Lappin (guitar) and Tony McGuigan (drums).

Formed in 1987 by brothers Christopher and Anthony Griffiths, the original line-up consisted of Chris Griffiths (guitar, vocals), Tony Griffiths (bass, vocals), Dave Reilly (drums, ex-China Crisis), Jay Norton (keyboards, ex-It's Immaterial), and Gordon Morgan (guitar, ex-Black). Tony Elson replaced Dave Reilly on drums and was later replaced by Garry Ford. Gordon Morgan was replaced by Phil Coxon, Sean Simpson, followed by Alan Gillibrand, then by Ian 'Sitar'.

The Band
Initially called JoJo & the Real People, the band started playing in local clubs and later toured as support act for the Inspiral Carpets, Ocean Colour Scene, the Pixies, Simple Minds, David Bowie, and others throughout the 1990s and onwards.

The group signed a management deal with local entrepreneur Mick Swift of Whitehouse Management, Bold Street, Liverpool in 1986. Their first record deal was brokered with Polydor Records in 1987, after Swift had persuaded Eddie Lundon of Kirkby band China Crisis to produce the demo of their debut single "One by One". The band also signed a publishing deal with Polygram. After "One by One", which would become a Top 10 hit for Cher in 1996, the band released a cover of Bob Crewe and Kenny Nolan's "Lady Marmalade", which was produced by Phil Harding at PWL with Stock Aitken Waterman acting as executive producers. Even though both songs would provide Top Ten hits for other artists in the 1990s, neither song charted for JoJo & The Real People in the 1980s.

The band self-released Mini L.P. in 1988. The following year, now managed by Jeffrey Abbotts, they were signed as the Real People by CBS on the Columbia label, although CBS were subsequently bought out by Sony. During this time, under the management of Jeffrey Abbotts, they toured extensively, including a major tour of the US, Japan, Europe, etc. etc. They released their self-titled major label debut album The Real People on 6 May 1991. All the songs were written by Chris and Tony Griffiths. This reached the number 59 in the UK Albums Chart. They recorded the follow-up album, Marshmellow Lane, for CBS, but although the Chris Allison produced "Believer", the first single from the album, charted at No. 38 and another single, "Too Much Too Young", appeared soon afterwards, the album was never actually released. Several tracks subsequently appeared on a two band compilation album called Liverpool – The Calm Before the Storm, released in 1996 on the Columbia label. Tony and Chris Griffiths went on to set up their own recording studio (Realistic Studios) in Birkenhead, Wirral, and started their own label Egg Records.

Their next album, What's on the Outside, was released independently under their own label on 4 November 1996. It was critically acclaimed but failed to make the charts. Although another album called Closer was reported to be in preparation in 2002, it was never released.

The Real People and Oasis
Oasis were still unsigned when Noel Gallagher first met Tony Griffiths of The Real People when he was roadie to the Inspiral Carpets. In 1992, determined to make a professional sounding demo, he contacted Griffiths and asked him to help record something to send out to record companies.

Paul Moody of the NME reported:-
'Used to the hard-knock school of the Manchester scene, Oasis were shocked by the co-operation of their scouse mates. "Because we'd got our own eight-track studio we let them come down to the Dock Road and record there," says Tony. "They were quite naive about recording, so we'd show them how to play the songs, how to think about the structure of the songs and the dynamics. We were just helping them because that's what bands do in Liverpool. I don't think it's quite the same in Manchester, because no one had done anything for them before."'

The result was the eight song music demo (later dubbed the Live Demonstration tape) recorded in Liverpool in 1993 that got Oasis their first record deal. The tape included many of the songs that eventually featured on the band's first album Definitely Maybe.

Chris and Tony Griffiths' input into the writing and recording process has since been fully acknowledged by Oasis. Tony Griffiths is credited with providing vocals on "Supersonic" on Definitely Maybe. Chris Griffiths also co-wrote "Rockin' Chair" with Noel Gallagher in 1993. This was released as the B-side to the single of "Roll with It" in 1995, and also appeared on the album The Masterplan. Chris Griffiths also claimed to have written the lyrics for "Columbia", with Liam Gallagher being responsible for the chorus, although the song is officially credited to Noel Gallagher only. Oasis Drummer Tony McCarroll tells the same story in his book Oasis: The Truth. They are both included in the documentary made for the Definitely Maybe 10th anniversary DVD.

Current work
In 2006, "Losing a Friend" was released in the UK as a single by the Icelandic girl group Nylon. It reached top 20 in the UK chart. Another Real People cover, "Closer" was the second single release from the group in October 2006. Both songs were number ones in Iceland.

They also wrote several tracks for the debut solo album by ex-Atomic Kitten, Natasha Hamilton. "Reaching Out" (co-written with Alistair Griffin and James and Tom Martin) was recorded by the Northern Irish band Bel's Boys and appeared on their 2007 album People Lets Go.

Chris and Tony Griffiths continue to perform live, both as solo artists and as backing for other bands. In November 2006 the Real People played a special benefit concert at the Carling Academy in Liverpool, for the mental health charity C.A.L.M. following another successful live gig in December. The Real People supported The Pretenders at the Liverpool Summer Pops,  on 9 July 2007  at the Aintree Pavilion Arena, Aintree Racecourse. They also appeared at Liverpool Arena on 19 January 2008 as part of The Number One Project singing a cover of "Hey Jude". This was later released on the charity album Liverpool – The Number Ones Album.
They have since played at the Carling Academy on 21 March 2008, at the Echo Arena supporting Duran Duran and also at the Cockpit in Leeds.

Their long delayed fourth studio album, Think Positive, was released on 6 December 2010. They continued to play gigs through 2010 and 2011, and more recently in March 2012 in York. In May 2012, Marshmellow Lane was eventually released.

The Real People's latest album, Monday Morning Breakdown,  was released on the 28 October 2016, through Townsend Records.

In 2018, the band performed as part of the high profile Star Shaped Festival tour at venues including the iconic Brixton Academy.

Discography

Albums

Singles

"Window Pane" also peaked at #11 on the US Modern Rock Tracks chart in 1992.

References
 Footnotes
Originally released in 1988 on cassette, followed by a proper reissue in 2012.

Initially meant to be released in 1992.

Released as Jo Jo and the Real People.
Citations

Sources

External links
 
CHRONOLOGY 1993 from Oasis FAQ
 (RealPlayer)
Promotional Video Clip from live performance at De Bees Music Bar 14 December 2006. Filmed and edited by Ian Scanlan (1).(Flash)
Promotional Video Clip from live performance at De Bees Music Bar 14 December 2006. Filmed and edited by Ian Scanlan  (2).(Flash)
The Real People's official website

Musical groups from Liverpool
English pop music groups
Britpop groups
English alternative rock groups
Musical groups established in 1988
Madchester groups